Terra Nova is a peer-reviewed scientific journal about geology and planetary science published by John Wiley & Sons Ltd. As of 2014, it had an impact factor of 2.639.

Geology journals